Tung Lo Wan (銅鑼灣) may refer to:
 The transliteration of the Chinese name of Causeway Bay, Hong Kong, as in Tung Lo Wan Road
 Tung Lo Wan (Sha Tin), a village in Tai Wai, Sha Tin District, Hong Kong